The 1964–65 season was Aberdeen's 52nd season in the top flight of Scottish football and their 54th season overall. Aberdeen competed in the Scottish League Division One, Scottish League Cup, Scottish Cup and the Summer Cup.

Results

Own goals in italics

Division 1

Final standings

1964 Summer Cup

Continued from May

Scottish League Cup

Group 1

Group 1 final table

Scottish Cup

1965 Summer Cup

Group 1

Group 1 final table

References

AFC Heritage Trust

Aberdeen F.C. seasons
Aber